The Mara are the native inhabitants of Mizoram in India, native to northeastern India, primarily in the Mara Autonomous District Council of the state of Mizoram, where they form the majority of the population. The Maras are related to Kuki and Mizos in India and Kachin, Karen, Shan and Chins in Myanmar.  Significant numbers of Maras also live in the southwestern and south-central parts of Chin State (Burma) in Myanmar - the contiguous area of Mara area in India mostly separated by Kolodyne / Chhimtuipui / Beino river, which forms an international boundary.

They have gone by a number of tribal names to the outside world. The Mara were earlier known as Magha, Miram, Baungshel, Maring, Zyu or Zao/Zho, Khuangsai. Additionally they were known as Lakher by the Tlaikao/Lushai, Miram by the Lai, and Shendu by the Khumi, Dai, Shô, Matu, and Rakhaing people. The new name Mara was added to the List of Scheduled Tribes in Mizoram state in 1978, replacing the old name. They constitute a distinct tribal group in the Siaha / Saiha district of Mizoram, while also occupying the northern part of Paletwa township and Matupi township, western and southern part of Thlantlang township, and the southern part of Hakha township. They refer to themselves as "Maras".

References

External links 
Chakhei.com : The first town portal in Maraland

Kuki tribes
Scheduled Tribes of India
Ethnic groups in India
Ethnic groups in Myanmar